Marionville is an unincorporated community in Northampton County, Virginia, United States.

The telephone area code for Marionville: (757)

References

GNIS reference

Unincorporated communities in Virginia
Unincorporated communities in Northampton County, Virginia